Benny Behanan (born 22 August 1952) is an Indian politician from Kerala. He is a member of the Indian National Congress party who serves as Member of Parliament from Chalakudy (Lok Sabha constituency). He was the MLA of Thrikkakara Legislative Assembly Constituency from 2011 to 2016. He was the General Secretary of the Kerala Pradesh Congress Committee for 17 years. Earlier he had won Piravom in 1982, and unsuccessfully contested the Idukki Parliament Constituency as UDF Candidate to the Lok Sabha  in 2004. In 2019 General election, he won the election with a margin of 132274 votes against the LDF candidate Innocent (actor).

Political life
Hailing from a Congress family, Benny Behanan has held various positions within the party.
State president of the Kerala Students Union (KSU) from 1978–1979
General Secretary, Kerala Pradesh Youth Congress Committee from 1979–1982
Member of KPCC Executive Since 1981
In 1982, he was elected to the Kerala State Legislative Assembly
All India Congress Committee (AICC) Member since 1996
Managing Director, Veekshanam Daily Newspaper  since 2006
President of Thrissur District Congress Committee since 2010
Member Legislative Assembly in 2011 (Thrikkakkara Constituency)
Convenor , United Democratic Front (UDF), 2018 - 2020

Personal life
Benny Behanan was born to O. Thomas and Chinnamma Thomas on 22 August 1952 at Vengola, near Perumbavoor in present-day Kerala state, South India.

References

Malayali politicians
Indian National Congress politicians from Kerala
1952 births
Living people
Politicians from Kochi
Kerala MLAs 2011–2016
India MPs 2019–present